Vivian Girls is the debut studio album by American indie rock band Vivian Girls. It was released in May 2008 by the label Mauled by Tigers.

After Mauled by Tigers' limited pressing of 500 LP copies quickly sold out, Vivian Girls was reissued on CD and LP by In the Red Records on October 7, 2008. It was reissued again by Polyvinyl Record Co. in 2019, alongside its 2009 follow-up Everything Goes Wrong.

Composition
Vivian Girls has been described by critics as an album of lo-fi and noise pop music. Pastes Henry Freedland said that it exhibits Vivian Girls' fusion of art punk and shoegaze-pop, while NME noted the presence of garage rock elements.

Critical reception

Vivian Girls was met with favorable reviews from music critics. The album holds a score of 80 out of 100 on the review aggregation website Metacritic, based on 15 reviews. NME stated that "between the omnipresent slabs of reverb, the trio flip between harmonic garage rock, gloomy melodies and twee-Birthday Partyisms". Jesse Darlin' of Plan B praised the songs' melodies as "all hard and spiky on the outside and gooey on the inside, like tough girl music should be."

At the end of 2008, Vivian Girls was named the ninth best album of the year by Rough Trade, while Pitchfork listed it as the year's 16th best album.

Legacy
Despite being polarizingly received when it was released, Vivian Girls has since grown in status. In a 10th-anniversary retrospective, Stereogums Patrick D. McDermott dubbed it "22 of the messiest and most influential minutes" in noise pop's late-2000s resurgence. Finding the album "hip and timeless", McDermott stated that it introduced lo-fi as an aesthetic and the importance of atmosphere and production to "millennial indie kids". He also credited it with giving listeners something different beyond the "pastoral-sounding boy bands and Coachella-band psych" common in indie music at the time.

Track listing

Personnel
Credits are adapted from the album's liner notes.

Vivian Girls
 Katy "Kickball Katy" Goodman – bass, vocals
 Cassie Ramone – guitar, lead vocals, cover artwork
 Frankie Rose – drums, vocals

Additional personnel
 Tim Fiore – tambourine
 Jeremy Scott – mixing, recording

Charts

References

External links
 

2008 debut albums
Vivian Girls albums
In the Red Records albums